Archil Lortkipanidze (born 7 May 1970) is a Georgian fencer. He competed in the individual sabre event at the 1996 Summer Olympics. Since then, he has worked at many clubs in and out of his country. He currently works at Tim Morehouse Fencing Club with 2008 silver medalist Tim Morehouse and former Olympian Slava Grigoriev.

References

External links
 

1970 births
Living people
Male sabre fencers from Georgia (country)
Olympic fencers of Georgia (country)
Fencers at the 1996 Summer Olympics
Sportspeople from Tbilisi